Oldenburgia grandis is a shrub or small, gnarled tree in the family Asteraceae. It occurs in the mountains around Grahamstown in South Africa. It grows to a height of about 5m on sandstone outcrops. It has thick corky bark and large leaves clustered at the ends of branches. The leaves are dark green and leathery, reminiscent of loquat leaves, but generally a good deal larger. The emergent leaves are densely and completely felted with white hair. Most of the felt is lost as the leaf matures, but some persists on under-surfaces. Flowers are white or purplish and borne in large heads some 5- to 12 cm in diameter. The flowerheads are terminal; The same plant may bear solitary heads, plus heads borne in loose, irregular panicles.
It is threatened by habitat loss.

References

Sources

External links

Oldenburgia
Trees of South Africa
Near threatened plants
Taxonomy articles created by Polbot
Taxa named by Henri Ernest Baillon
Taxa named by Carl Peter Thunberg